The Riversimple Urban Car is a conceptual open source hydrogen fuel cell vehicle that was proposed by Hugo Spowers' company, Riversimple, in 2009. Their latest model, the Rasa, was unveiled on 17 February 2016.

The plan has been subsequently superseded with the intention to develop a production vehicle of a similar format but with a new design in 2018–19.

Design 

The Riversimple Urban Car was designed and developed in the United Kingdom by teams at Cranfield and Oxford Universities. It was backed by Sebastian Piech, the great-grandson of Ferdinand Porsche.

The Urban Car is a two-passenger vehicle about the size of a Smart. It weighs , and the prototype was constructed of a Carbon fiber composite material body.

Operation 

The Urban Car is powered by a fuel cell from Horizon Fuel Cell Technologies that converts hydrogen into electricity. This power supply functions like a battery, uses no moving parts, and emits only pure water. There are two novel principles involved with this project: decoupling of acceleration from cruising, and mass decompounding.

Decoupling acceleration and cruise means that the fuel cell will only need to be large enough to supply the power needed for maintaining a constant speed, which is about 20% of the power needed for acceleration. Most of the car's braking is done by electric motors on each wheel. These motors capture the energy of the car in motion, and store it as electricity in a bank of electric double-layer capacitors (ultra-capacitors). This electricity is used to provide 75% of the power used in acceleration. Because of this, the Urban Car can be powered by a 6 kW fuel cell, which is significantly smaller than the Honda FCX Clarity's 100 kW fuel cell. This requires less hydrogen to be stored on board, and results in an overall lighter vehicle.

Mass decompounding involves designing the car as a complete system, as opposed to redesigning a car originally conceived as being powered by an internal combustion engine into a fuel cell vehicle. The combination of a small fuel cell, along with elimination of the unnecessary gearbox, drive shafts, power-assist systems, and associated components, results in a very lightweight vehicle.

Retail and licensing 

, Riversimple planned to lease the cars over 15 years instead of selling them, with fueling included in the leasing cost. This was intended to increase the life of the vehicles, and reduce materials usage. The cost of the lease was expected to be about £200 (US$330) per month.

, the open source design for the Riversimple Urban Car was planned to be stored on the 40 Fires wiki site online. The wiki project is called The Hyrban. 
At that time, Riversimple planned to lease the design to any small manufacturer for free, modify it as desired, and build their own version of the vehicle.

The CAD models for the Riversimple Hyrban technology demonstrator have been released under a Creative Commons license, attribution 3.0.

See also 

 Hydrogen economy
 Morgan LIFEcar
 List of fuel cell vehicles

References

External links 

 
 
 

Hydrogen cars
Fuel cell vehicles
Concept cars
Open hardware vehicles